Echezonachukwu Chinedu Nduka (born 19 July 1989) is a Nigerian poet, author, pianist, recording artist, and musicologist specializing in piano music by West African composers. His work has been featured on BBC, Radio Nacional Clasica de Argentina, Radio France International (rfi), and Classical Journey.

Career

Academia and writing
Nduka worked in Nigeria as a lecturer in Alvan Ikoku Federal College of Education (later known as Alvan Ikoku University of Education), Owerri. In addition, he has worked as a freelance writer and columnist for The Nigerian Telegraph, and for African Hadithi, a Pan-African online media platform where his essays and poetry have been published. His essay "Preserving the Igbo Cultural Dogmas via Literature: From Chinua Achebe to Onyeka Nwelue" garnered enormous readership and debates. Nduka has been listed as one of the five Nigerian contemporary writers to watch out for.
His published critical reviews and appraisals are centered on contemporary African literature with emphasis on poetry and fiction by authors of African descent.

Literary journals and anthologies

Poetry
Nduka's poem "Etude" won the Bronze Prize at the 4th Korea-Nigeria Poetry Feast. In 2016, he emerged winner of the 6th Korea-Nigeria Poetry Feast Prize for his poem "Listen". One of his spoken-word poems titled "We Wear Purple Robes" is a reflection on terrorism in Nigeria. His work has been published in reputable literary journals and anthologies including Transition Magazine,Sentinel Nigeria, Sentinel Literary Quarterly, River River, The Bombay Review, Bakwa, African Writer, Jalada Africa, Saraba Magazine, The Indianapolis Review, Kissing Dynamite, The Village Square Journal, 20.35 Africa: An Anthology of Contemporary Poetry Vol.II, Black Communion: Poems of 100 New African Poets, From Here to There: A Cross Cultural Poetry Anthology, A Thousand Voices Rising: An Anthology of Contemporary African Poetry, The Solace of Nature: An Anthology of International Poetry, The Bombay Review: An Anthology of Short Fiction and Poetry, among several others.  Some of his poems have been translated into Norwegian, French, and Arabic

International Poetic Project
In the summer of 2015, the third edition of the international poetic project in honor of the legendary Russian poet, singer, songwriter and actor Vladimir Vysotsky was published in the US. The project, which is essentially a world poetry anthology compiled and edited by Marlena Zimna, the Director of Polish Vladimir Vysotsky's Museum in Koszalin, features Nduka's Igbo translations of Vladimir Vysotsky's poems alongside translations in Greek, Hindi, Maori, Xhosa, Meitei, Peru, Fante, Georgian, Cebuano, Maltese, Gujarati, Assamese, French, and several other world languages by notable poets and translators from different parts of the world.

Fiction
"Something from Ozumba], in The Kalahari Review, 2013
"A Dream in August", in Tuck Magazine, 2015
"Kizomba", in Ake Review, 2016
"The Journey", in Afridiaspora, 2016
"Gondola Street", in African Writer, 2016
"Being Alphonso", in Transition Magazine, 2017
"Playing the Music of Dead Men", in Maple Tree Literary Supplement, 2018

Nonfiction
"On Freedom Falls & Contrastive Realism", in My Africa, My City: An Afridiaspora Anthology, 2016
"Memories in Three Mementoes", in EXPOUND: Issue #9, 2017
"Art as a Lifeline", in Praxis Magazine Anthology, 2020
"Redreaming the Sound", in Olongo Africa, 2021

Books
 Chrysanthemums for Wide-eyed Ghosts (2018)
 Waterman (2020)

Filmography
2015: We Wear Purple Robes (Poetry film)
2016: Console Me (Short film)
2016: Listen (Poetry film)
2016: '' Where the Road Leads (Poetry film)

Recordings
 Choreowaves: African Classical Piano Music (Digital EP)
 Nine Encores (Digital EP)

See also
 List of Nigerian film producers

References

External links

BBC World Service, Newsday
Poem Hunter
Kalahari Review
African Hadithi
Three Poems by Echezonachukwu Nduka
Two Poems by Echezonachukwu Nduka
Echezonachukwu Nduka reads his poem "We Wear Purple Robes" reflecting on terrorism

1989 births
Living people
Nigerian literary critics
Nigerian male short story writers
Nigerian short story writers
Nigerian poets
English-language writers from Nigeria
21st-century Nigerian writers
Nigerian musicians
Nigerian philosophers
Nigerian essayists
Igbo essayists
Igbo poets
Igbo educators
Igbo activists
Igbo writers
Igbo literary critics
Igbo short story writers
People from Anambra State
Nigerian filmmakers
Nigerian musicologists
Male essayists
Nigerian male poets
21st-century short story writers
21st-century essayists
21st-century male writers
Igbo people